Rolla Harrison Daringer (November 15, 1888 – May 23, 1974) was a shortstop in Major League Baseball. He played for the St. Louis Cardinals. Younger brother of Cliff Daringer.

In 1909, Daringer's baseball career started with four seasons in Dubuqua, when St. Louis signed him towards the end of the 1914 season, where he played until the end of the 1915 season. He then played American League ball for the duration of his career (1916–1921), taking a break when he joined the Army for World War I in 1918.

References

External links

1888 births
1974 deaths
Major League Baseball shortstops
St. Louis Cardinals players
Baseball players from Indiana
People from Hayden, Indiana
Dubuque Dubs players
Dubuque Hustlers players
Peoria Distillers players
Bloomington Bloomers players
Milwaukee Brewers (minor league) players
Houston Buffaloes players